Leptopyrgota is a genus of flies in the family Pyrgotidae.

Species

References 

Pyrgotidae
Diptera of South America
Brachycera genera
Taxa named by Friedrich Georg Hendel